Dolzhansky District is an administrative and municipal district (raion), one of the twenty-four in Oryol Oblast, Russia. It is located in the southeast of the oblast. Its administrative center is the urban locality (an urban-type settlement) of Dolgoye. Population: 11,984 (2010 Census);  The population of Dolgoye accounts for 37.1% of the district's total population.

Notable residents 

Ivan Ilich Dolgikh (1904–1961), Soviet police officer and politician, head of the Gulag labour camps 1951–1954
Anatoly Yakunin (born 1964), Moscow Police Commissioner 2012–2016, born in the village of Krivtsovo-Plota

References

Notes

Sources

Districts of Oryol Oblast